Erythrolamprus epinephalus is a species of snake in the Colubridae family. It is endemic to South America. The snake, which was described by Edward Drinker Cope in 1862, is notable for its apparent immunity to the toxic skin of the Golden poison dart frog, which it preys upon.

Common name: fire-bellied snake

References 

Reptiles described in 1862
Erythrolamprus
Taxa named by Edward Drinker Cope
Taxobox binomials not recognized by IUCN